Aïn Mellouk is a town and commune in Mila Province, Algeria. At the 1998 census it had a population of 12,716.

References

Communes of Mila Province